The Moorish Queen (Spanish:La reina mora) is a 1922 Spanish silent film directed by José Buchs. It was based on a zarzuela, which was made into further films in 1937 and 1954.

Cast
 José Aguilera 
 Gloria Aymerich 
 Francisco Cejuela 
 María Comendador 
 Carmen de Córdoba 
 Antonio Gil Varela 'Varillas' as Don Nué  
 José Montenegro 
 Consuelo Reyes

References

Bibliography
  Eva Woods Peiró. White Gypsies: Race and Stardom in Spanish Musical Films. U of Minnesota Press, 2012.

External links

1922 films
Films directed by José Buchs
Spanish silent films
Spanish black-and-white films